King Minjung (?–48, r. 44–48) was the fourth ruler of Goguryeo, the northernmost of the Three Kingdoms of Korea. According to The History of the Three Kingdoms, he was the younger brother of the country’s third ruler, King Daemusin, and the fifth son of the second ruler, King Yuri.

Background 
According to the Samguk Sagi, a 12th-century Korean history of the Three Kingdoms, Minjung was the fifth and youngest son of Yuri (Goguryeo's second King), as well as the youngest brother of his predecessor Daemusin. His original name was Hae Saek-ju or Hae Eup-ju, and some scholars believe the king’s surname was Hae. The Samguk Sagi states that at the time of Daemusin's death the crown prince was his eldest son Mobon (then known as Hae U), but Mobon was still too young to rule. Thus, Minjung (then known as Haesaekjoo) ascended to the throne with national support.[2] However, an alternative account exists in the Samguk Yusa, stating that Minjung was the son of Daemusin and the younger brother of Mobon.

Reign 
During Minjung's five years of reign, he avoided military conflict and maintained peace throughout most of the kingdom. 
A massive pardon of prisoners occurred in his first year of reign.
Several natural disasters marked his reign, including a flood during his second year of reign that occurred in the eastern provinces causing several citizens to lose their homes and starve. Seeing this, Minjung opened up the food storage and distributed food to the people.
In his third year of reign, it didn't snow in the capital.
In his fourth year of reign, Minjung found a stone grotto in the Western region of his kingdom and was said to have rested in it after a long hunt.

Death
In the year 48, during the fifth year of his reign, Minjung fell ill and died. On his deathbed, he requested to be buried in a grotto in Minjung-won, where he was eventually laid to rest. As a result, he was given the posthumous name, Minjung.

See also
History of Korea
Three Kingdoms of Korea
List of Korean monarchs

Notes

References

Goguryeo rulers
48 deaths
1st-century monarchs in Asia
1st-century Korean people
Year of birth unknown